Satish Chandra Dwivedi is an Indian politician and member of 17th Legislative Assembly of Uttar Pradesh and currently serving as Minister of State (Independent Charge) for Primary education. He is the representative of the Itwa (Assembly constituency) constituency of Uttar Pradesh and is a member of Bharatiya Janata Party.

Early life and education
Dwivedi was born on 1 May 1978 in Shanichara village in Siddharthnagar district of Uttar Pradesh to Lt. Ayodhya Prasad Dwivedi. In 2009, he married Dr. Kalyani Dwivedi, they have one son and one daughter. He hails from a Brahmin family. In 2010, he attended Deen Dayal Upadhyay Gorakhpur University and received Doctor of Philosophy (PhD).

Political career
Dwivedi's political life began with the student council. He was successful in the legislature in the first attempt. In 17th Legislative Assembly of Uttar Pradesh (2017) elections, he defeated erstwhile assembly speaker Mata Prasad Pandey (Samajwadi Party) by a margin of 12,923 votes.

In August 2019, after first cabinet expansion of Yogi Adityanath Government he was appointed Minister of State (Independent Charge) for Basic Education.

Posts held
 March 2017– Incumbent, Member in 17th Legislative Assembly of Uttar Pradesh
 August 2019– Incumbent, Minister of State (Independent Charge) for Basic Education in Government of Uttar Pradesh

References

Uttar Pradesh MLAs 2017–2022
Bharatiya Janata Party politicians from Uttar Pradesh
Living people
People from Siddharthnagar district
1978 births